Gasper is an unincorporated community located in Logan County, Kentucky, United States. It was also known as Bucksville.

References

Unincorporated communities in Logan County, Kentucky
Unincorporated communities in Kentucky